The city of Ottawa, Canada held municipal elections on December 2, 1974. Controller Lorry Greenberg defeated fellow controller Tom McDougall.

Mayor of Ottawa

Ottawa Board of Control
(4 elected)

City council

References
Ottawa Journal, December 3, 1974

Municipal elections in Ottawa
1974 elections in Canada
1970s in Ottawa
1974 in Ontario